Formula LGB Swift is a single seater, open wheel class in motorsport in India launched in 2003. The cars are powered by 1.3 liter Maruti Esteem engines (also used in the Suzuki Swift) and are driven by top and upcoming Indian drivers in the National Racing Championship. This car can be considered as an Indian equivalent of Europe's Formula Ford series, where it is void of aerodynamic aids like wings. From 2006 this car replaced Formula Maruti as an entry level formula car. This series offers the first feel and insights into open wheel racing for an upcoming race driver.

Name
LGB denotes L. G. Balakrishnan Brothers, the manufacturers of Rolon chains and sprockets. LGB is the parent company of Super Speeds which designs and constructs the cars. Swift denotes the engine supplier Maruti Udyog.
The car was named Formula LGB from 2003 till 2005. In 2006 Swift was added to avoid name confusion with the launch of another Hyundai engined Formula LGB (Formula LGB Hyundai) which was slightly different in layout and design.

Design

Early version
The car was originally named Formula LGB from 2003 till 2005 and the engines were the same 1.3 liter used in the Maruti Esteem but in carburated form with a single overhead cam. Still the car had 50% more power (65 b.h.p. being its stock version in carburetor form), than the stock version in race trim.

Current version
In the 2006 season, the car was renamed Formula LGB Swift and Maruti Swift's 1.3 litre 16 valve MPFI engine was refitted.
The engine is mounted in a transverse direction with the stock gearbox as in a front wheel drive car.

Chassis
The chassis is a steel spaceframe monocoque with fire retardant composite GRP panels. The design is on the heavier side, mainly for structural and safety reasons. The steel tubes are of square section and the tyres are supplied by JK Tyres in a grooved slick pattern.
The Formula Swift rides on aluminium wheels and both front and rear tyres are 185/60.

Costs
Along with Formula LGB Hyundai this is one of the cheapest formula cars in the world to race, with rental for Friday practise, Saturday qualifying and a double race on Sunday (15 laps each), costing only $800 (as of 2005). That rate includes tyres and fuel.

Races

Races for the national championship are held at Coimbatore's Kari Motor Speedway and at Chennai's MMSC Irrugatukottai track.
The car is designed and built by Coimbatore-based Super Speeds Pvt. Ltd. for LG Sports, makers of Rolon chains and sprockets, Coimbatore. The car was designed by ex-racer B. Viji (also known as B. Vijaykumar) with JK Tyres being the championship sponsor and also sponsoring some of the drivers.
Maruti Udyog presents the championship winner a brand new Maruti car. In 2006 it was Maruti Swift.

Champions

* Denotes wins in Formula LGB

See also
Formula LGB Hyundai
FISSME (a.k.a.Formula Maruti)
Formula Rolon
JK Tyre National Racing Championship

More pictures
https://web.archive.org/web/20070520121336/http://www.thehinduimages.com:8080/hindu/photoDetail.do?photoId=4724733
https://web.archive.org/web/20070522120707/http://www.thehinduimages.com:8080/hindu/photoDetail.do?photoId=4724739
https://web.archive.org/web/20070520121824/http://www.thehinduimages.com:8080/hindu/photoDetail.do?photoId=4956633

External links
https://web.archive.org/web/20060510012030/http://www.newstodaynet.com/05dec/cs4.htm
Ganpat Amarnath
https://web.archive.org/web/20070310232841/http://www.chennaionline.com/colnews/newsitem.asp?NEWSID=%7B34E1CFAD-DD02-4545-9492-6D9B70DB8EED%7D&CATEGORYNAME=BUSINESS
Madras Motor Sports Club 

Lgb Swift
Indian racing cars
One-make series